Iwye District is a district (rajon) in Grodno Region of Belarus.

The administrative center is Iwye. Another notable settlement is Hieraniony (Gieraniony), a small historic town with two Category II objects of national cultural heritage (the castle and the parish church).

Notable residents 
 Jan Pazniak (1887 or 1895, Subotniki - after October 1939), Belarusian politician and publisher, victim of Soviet repressions
 Zianon Pazniak (born 24 April 1944), Belarusian politician, one of the founders of the Belarusian Popular Front and leader of the Conservative Christian Party – BPF

 
Districts of Grodno Region